Louise Fréchette, OC (born July 16, 1946) is a Canadian diplomat and public servant who served for eight years as United Nations Deputy Secretary-General. She also served a three-year term at the Centre for International Governance Innovation, an international relations and policy think-tank in Waterloo, Ontario, working on a major research project on nuclear energy and the world's security.

Early life and education
Born in Montreal, Fréchette graduated with a degree in history from the Université de Montréal in 1970 and from the College of Europe (Bruges) with a postgraduate Certificate of Advanced European Studies (equivalent to a master's degree) in 1978.

Career

Diplomatic career
Fréchette began her career in 1971 when she joined Canada's Department of External Affairs. She was posted to the Canadian embassy in Athens before joining Canada's UN delegation in Geneva in 1978.

In 1985, at the age of 39, Fréchette was named Canada's ambassador to Argentina. In 1989, she was sent on a secret mission to Cuba to lobby Fidel Castro to support the Gulf War. While unsuccessful, she impressed Ottawa with her efforts and was named Canada's ambassador to the United Nations in 1992.

In 1995, Fréchette left the foreign service to become assistant deputy minister of finance in Ottawa. She was later promoted to deputy minister of national defense, the first woman to hold that position.

Deputy Secretary General of the UN
In 1997, UN Secretary General Kofi Annan announced a series of reforms at the world body, including the creation of the position of deputy secretary-general to handle many of the administrative responsibilities which had previously been the responsibility of the secretary-general. Fréchette was offered the position and accepted and has been responsible for overseeing numerous reforms at the UN. While at the United Nations, Fréchette – working with her U.S. counterpart Madeleine K. Albright, among others – was pivotal in devising a peacekeeping operation for Haiti with the return from exile of President Jean-Bertrand Aristide in 1994.

In 2005, after being criticized by former U.S. Federal Reserve Chairman Paul Volcker for failed management of the Iraq Oil-for-Food Program, Fréchette announced her resignation.

Later career
Fréchette is a Member of the Global Leadership Foundation and is a member of the International Advisory Board at the Institute for the Study of International Development (ISID) at McGill University. She was a member of the International Atomic Energy Agency (IAEA) Commission of Eminent Persons on nuclear energy challenges which issued its report in April 2008.

Other activities

Corporate boards
 Essilor, Independent Member of the Board of Directors
 Shell Canada, Independent Member of the Board of Directors (2006-2007)

Non-profit organizations
 CARE Canada, Chair of the Board (since 2011)
 CARE International, Chair of the Supervisory Board
 Global Leadership Foundation (GLF), Member
 International Commission on Nuclear Non-proliferation and Disarmament  (ICNND), Member of the Advisory Board
 Montreal Centre for International Studies, Member of the Advisory Board
 Montreal Council on Foreign Relations (MCFR), Member of the Board of Directors

Recognition
In 1998, Fréchette was made an Officer of the Order of Canada.

References

External links
UN Deputy Secretary-General biography
CIGI Distinguished Fellow biography
C-SPAN appearances

|-

1946 births
Deputy Secretaries-General of the United Nations
Permanent Representatives of Canada to the United Nations
Living people
Officers of the Order of Canada
Université de Montréal alumni
College of Europe alumni
Canadian officials of the United Nations
Ambassadors of Canada to Argentina
Canadian women ambassadors